Almirante is a district (distrito) of Bocas del Toro Province in Panama. It was created by Law 39 on 8 June 2015, in which it was split off from Changuinola District.

Administrative divisions
Almirante District is divided administratively into the following corregimientos:

 Puerto Almirante
 Nance de Risco
 Valle del Risco
 Valle de Aguas Arriba
 Barriada Guaymí
 Barrio Francés

References

Districts of Bocas del Toro Province
2015 establishments in Panama
States and territories established in 2015